Garlic knots are a type of garlic bread found primarily in pizzerias around New York City and the surrounding regions. They were developed in the 1940s in Brooklyn. Many pizzerias claim to be the progenitors of the baked good.

As they are a way to make use of scraps, garlic knots tend to be the least expensive item on a pizzeria menu, often provided as complimentary with larger orders.

Making garlic knots

Garlic knots are typically made from bread dough. The dough is rolled and then pulled into small, tight overhand knots, and pre-baked in a pizza oven (temperatures of 700 °F or higher). The knots are then dipped in or generously brushed with a mix of oil, Parmesan cheese, and crushed garlic; variations can include finely chopped parsley, dried oregano, or black pepper. Before serving, garlic knots are baked a second time, and may be accompanied by marinara sauce.

See also
 List of hors d'oeuvre

References

Pizza
Appetizers
Garlic dishes